The year 1975 involved some significant events in television. Below is a list of television-related events which happened that year.

Events
January 3 
The original Jeopardy! ends its run after almost 11 years and 2,753 episodes on NBC
Also on NBC, the biggest prize in American daytime television game shows at the time is won on Jackpot, $38,750, split between two contestants
January 6 
Another World becomes the first American soap opera to start airing hour-long telecasts
Wheel of Fortune airs its first episode on NBC's daytime schedule with host Chuck Woolery and assistant Susan Stafford
The ORTF is split-up into 7 companies: TF1, Antenne 2, FR3, INA, SFP, Radio France & TDF
January 11 – On All in the Family, a tearful Edith says goodbye to her neighbor, Louise Jefferson as The Jeffersons moved on up to their own sitcom
March 1 - It's "C-Day" in Australia. Full-time color television production takes effect today
March 4 – The first People's Choice Awards presentation on CBS
March 18 – McLean Stevenson's character dies in the M*A*S*H episode "Abyssinia, Henry", its third season finale
April 1 – The New Zealand Broadcasting Corporation is dissolved; NZBC TV is renamed Television One.
April 3 – Meg Richardson (Noele Gordon) marries Hugh Mortimer (John Bentley) on the soap opera Crossroads
April 5 – The Super Sentai series made its debut on TV Asahi with Himitsu Sentai Gorenger
April 12 – On The Jeffersons, Mike Evans makes his last appearance (until 1979), with Damon Evans (no relation to Michael) joining the cast
April 21 – Days of Our Lives becomes the second American soap opera to expand from thirty minutes to an hour in length
April 25 – "Alice Cooper: The Nightmare" airs on ABC
April 28 – Tom Snyder interviews John Lennon on The Tomorrow Show
June 5 – Fred Silverman becomes the head of ABC Entertainment, whose programming choices resulted in ABC achieving ratings dominance (and initiating an era of what was disparagingly called "T&A" or "Jiggle television")
June 30 – TV2 launches in New Zealand, becoming the country's second television network.
September 5 – A bomb explodes in the wine bar/delicatessen on Number 96, in an attempt to shake up the cast and earn back lost viewers
September 8
The Price is Right is expanded to an hour in length, with six games and two Showcase Showdowns, for one week as an experiment; the format is made permanent two months later
Match Game starts airing weekly episodes in syndicated primetime as Match Game PM.
September 29 – WGPR-TV, channel 62 in Detroit, becomes the first television station in the U.S. to be owned and operated by blacks (It is now CBS-owned WWJ-TV)
September 30 – The Muhammad Ali–Joe Frazier title fight from the Philippines (the "Thrilla in Manila") is sent via satellite to the U. S. and shown on HBO
October 11 - The premiere episode of Saturday Night Live is broadcast on NBC
October 16 – The "Balibo Five" Australian television journalists are killed at Balibo by Indonesian Army special forces in the buildup to the Indonesian invasion of East Timor
October 21 – NBC broadcasts the now legendary 12-inning long sixth game of the World Series between the Boston Red Sox and Cincinnati Reds. The game ends with Boston catcher Carlton Fisk's home run to send the series to a climatic seventh game. In what has now become an iconic baseball film highlight, the NBC left-field game camera caught Fisk wildly waving his arms to his right after hitting the ball and watching its path while drifting down the first base line, as if he was trying to coax the ball to "stay fair". The ball indeed stayed fair and the Red Sox had tied the Series. (According to the NBC cameraman Lou Gerard, located inside the left field wall scoreboard, cameramen at the time were instructed to follow the flight of the ball. Instead, Gerard was distracted by a rat nearby, thus he lost track of the baseball and instead decided to capture the image of Fisk "magically" waving the ball fair). The game was ranked Number 1 in MLB Network's 20 Greatest Games. 
October 25 – The classic "Chuckles Bites the Dust" episode of The Mary Tyler Moore Show airs on CBS
October 28 – A James Bond film is shown on British television for the first time, Dr. No on ITV
 November – Sony introduces the Betamax video recorder in the US, which comes in a teakwood console with a 19" color TV set and retails for $2,495
November 7 – The New Original Wonder Woman TV movie airs as a pilot for the series, Wonder Woman (which premiered in 1976)
November 10 – The Guiding Light changes its name to Guiding Light, in an attempt to modernize the show's image (The show's announcer, however, continues to call the series The Guiding Light in his announcements until the early 1980s)
November 23 – Memories of the "Heidi Game" return to haunt NBC as that network is forced to join Willy Wonka & the Chocolate Factory in progress at the conclusion of an overtime NFL game
December 1 – Top-rated As the World Turns, bowing to competition from NBC, expands to one hour in length; The Edge of Night moves to ABC
December 25 – World Television Premiere of Butch Cassidy and the Sundance Kid, on BBC1

Programs 

60 Minutes (1968–present)
All in the Family (1971–1979)
All My Children (1970–2011)
American Bandstand (1952–1989)
Another World (1964–1999)
Are You Being Served? (UK) (1972–1985)
As the World Turns (1956–2010)
 Aşk-ı Memnu (Turkey) (1975)
Barnaby Jones (1973–1980)
Blue Peter (UK) (1958–present)
Bozo the Clown (1949–present)
Candid Camera (1948–present)
Captain Kangaroo (1955–1984)
Chico and the Man (1974–1978)
Columbo (1971–1978)
Come Dancing (UK) (1949–1995)
Coronation Street, UK (1960–present)
Countdown (Australia) (1974–1987)
Crossroads, UK (1964–1988, 2001–2003)
Dad's Army (UK) (1968–1977)
Days of Our Lives (1965–present)
Dean Martin Celebrity Roast (1974–1984)
Derrick (1974–1998)
Dinah! (1974–1980)
Dixon of Dock Green (UK) (1955–1976)
Doctor Who, UK (1963–1989, 1996, 2005–present)
Emergency! (1972–1977)
Emmerdale Farm (UK) (1972–present)
Face the Nation (1954–present)
Fat Albert and the Cosby Kids (1972–1984)
Four Corners, Australia (1961–present)
General Hospital (1963–present)
Get Some In! (UK) (1975–78)Good Times (1974–1979)Grandstand (UK) (1958–2007)Hallmark Hall of Fame (1951–present)Happy Days (1974–1984)Hawaii Five-O (1968–1980)Hee Haw (1969–1993)Hockey Night in Canada (1952–present)It's Academic (1961–present)John Craven's Newsround (UK) (1972–present)
 Kaynanalar (Turkey) (1974–2004)Kojak (1973–1978, 2005–present)Land of the Lost (1974–1977)Last of the Summer Wine (UK) (1973–present)Little House on the Prairie (1974–1983)Love of Life (1951–1980)Magpie (UK) (1968–1980)Marcus Welby, M.D. (1969–1976)Mary Tyler Moore (1970–1977)M*A*S*H (1972–1983)Masterpiece Theatre (1971–present)Match Game (1962–1969, 1973–1984, 1990–1991, 1998–1999)Maude (1972–1978)McCloud (1970–1977)McMillan & Wife (1971–1977)Meet the Press (1947–present)Monday Night Football (1970–present)Mutual of Omaha's Wild Kingdom (1963–1988, 2002–present)Old Grey Whistle Test (UK) (1971–1987)One Life to Live (1968–2012)Opportunity Knocks (UK) (1956–1978)Panorama (UK) (1953–present)Play for Today (UK) (1970–1984)Play School (1966–present)Police Woman (1974–1978)Rhoda (1974–1978)Sanford and Son (1972–1977)Schoolhouse Rock! (1973–1986)Search for Tomorrow (1951–1986)Sesame Street (1969–present)Soul Train (1971–2008)Superstars (UK) (1973–1985, 2003–2005)Tattletales (1974–1978, 1982–1984)The Benny Hill Show (UK) (1969–1989)The Bionic Woman (1976–1978)The Bob Newhart Show (1972–1978)The Carol Burnett Show (1967–1978)The Doctors (1963–1982)The Edge of Night (1956–1984)The Good Old Days (UK) (1953–1983)The Guiding Light (1952–2009)The Late Late Show, Ireland (1962–present)The Lawrence Welk Show (1955–1982)The Mike Douglas Show (1961–1981)The Money Programme (UK) (1966–present)The Price Is Right (1972–present)The Rockford Files (1974–1980)The Six Million Dollar Man (1973–1978)The Sky at Night (UK) (1957–present)The Today Show (1952–present)The Tomorrow Show (1973–1982)The Tonight Show (1954–present)The Waltons (1972–1981)The Wonderful World of Disney (1954–present; 1969–79 with this title)The Young and the Restless (1973–present)This Is Your Life (UK) (1955–2003)Tiswas (UK) (1974–1982)Tom and Jerry (1965–1972, 1975–1977, 1980–1982)Top of the Pops, UK (1964–2006)Truth or Consequences (1950–1988)What the Papers Say (UK) (1956–present)Wide World of Sports (1961–1997)Wish You Were Here...? (UK) (1974–present)World of Sport, UK (1965–1985)Z-Cars, UK (1962–1978)

Debuts
January 2 – The Sweeney on ITV in the UK (1975–78)
January 5 - Paddington on BBC1/CBBC (1975-80)
January 6 Wheel of Fortune on NBC's daytime lineup (1975–89)Blank Check the same day, also on NBC, and lasts 26 weeks
January 17 – Baretta, starring Robert Blake, on ABC (1975–78)
January 18 – The Jeffersons, a spinoff of All in the Family, on CBS (1975–85)
January 23 – Barney Miller on ABC (1975–82)
January 30 – Archer on NBC (1975) 
February 17 – S.W.A.T. on ABC (1975–76)
April 4 – The Good Life on BBC1 in the UK (1975–78)
April 5 – Himitsu Sentai Gorenger on TV Asahi (formerly NET) in Japan (1975–77)
April 16 – Survivors on BBC1 (1975–77)
April 21 – Blankety Blanks on ABC's daytime lineup
May 8 – The Don Lane Show on the Nine Network in Australia (1975–83)
May 31 – Jim'll Fix It on BBC1 (1975–94)
June 16 – Spin-Off and Musical Chairs on CBS's daytime lineup
June 30 – Showoffs on ABC's daytime lineup
July 7Ryan's Hope on ABC's daytime lineup (1975–89)Rhyme and Reason the same day, also on ABC's daytime lineupThe Magnificent Marble Machine, on NBC's daytime lineup, from the same host who brought Blank CheckSeptember 2 – Runaround on ITV (1975–81)
September 4 The Bobby Vinton Show on CTV in Canada and across the U.S. in syndication (1975–78)Space: 1999 (syndicated 1975–77)
September 6 
Hanna-Barbera's The New Tom and Jerry/Grape Ape Show on ABC Saturday Morning (1975–76)Supersonic, a pop music program, on London Weekend Television (1975–77)
Funny Farm – (CTV, 1975–80)
September 8Phyllis, a spin-off of The Mary Tyler Moore Show on CBS (1975–77)Match Game PM (1975–82)Give-n-Take on CBS's daytime lineup
September 9 Welcome Back, Kotter on ABC (1975–79)Shades of Greene on Thames Television in the UK (1975–76)
September 14 – Three for the Road on CBS and ends promptly on November 30
September 15 – The Fifth Estate on CBC (1975–present)
September 19 – Fawlty Towers on BBC Two in the UK (1975, 1979)
September 25 – King of Kensington on CBC (1975–80)
September 29 – Three for the Money on NBC's daytime lineup and it lasts only nine weeks
October 1 – Arena on BBC2 in the UK (1975–present)
October 11 – Saturday Night Live (1975–present)
November 3 – Good Morning America on ABC with co-anchors David Hartman and Nancy Dussault (1975–present)
November 16 - Donny & Marie (1976 TV series)November 7 – Wonder Woman on ABC (1975–79)
November 30 – McCoy on NBC (1975–76)
December 16 – One Day at a Time,'' produced by Norman Lear, on CBS (1975–84)

Ending this year

Changes of network affiliation

Births

Deaths

See also 
 1975–76 United States network television schedule

References